Ceratizit–WNT Pro Cycling (UCI code WNT) is a professional women's cycling team, based in Kempten, Germany, which competes in elite road bicycle racing events such as the UCI Women's World Tour.

History
The team was founded in 2014 as an amateur club team in Sheffield / UK competing in regional and national races with the occasional UCI level race. After three years the team was transformed from an amateur team into a professional UCI team, and is invited to compete in major races all over Europe. The team itself no longer consists purely of British riders. Since 2019 the team includes women of seven different countries (Germany, Austria, Netherlands, Italy, Spain, France and Canada) giving it an even greater international flavour. 2019 saw a big expansion and inclusion of high-level riders into the team roster such as Kirsten Wild, Lisa Brennauer and Ane Santesteban. Due this expansion the team made the step-up into the top 10 of the UCI-ranking, with a ranking of 7th place. In 2020 the team signed Maria Giulia Confalonieri of Italy and Julie Leth of Denmark, both double European Champions.

2017
Ahead of the 2017 season, WNT made another leap in the team's progression by applying for a UCI Women's team licence, with former Scottish Cycling head coach Graeme Herd as their directeur sportif. Expanding its roster outside the UK and Ireland, gaining Austrian Anna Badegruber and Luxembourger Elise Maes from Austrian team Vitalogic Astrokalb Radunion Nö as it stepped away from its UCI Women licence in 2017.

The team won its first professional race in its first outing as a UCI team in March 2017, on stage 4 of Setmana Ciclista Valenciana when Irish Champion Lydia Boylan soloed to victory. The team's second UCI victory came at the Lotto Thüringen Ladies Tour on stage 3, when Hayley Simmonds attacked in the closing kilometres, taking a solo victory of over a minute, and consequently moved into the yellow jersey. Simmonds finished 3rd place on general classification behind Lisa Brennauer.

At the end of 2017, the team's service course moved from the UK to Reutte, Austria, the hometown of WNT's parent company, Ceratizit, although the team's address registered with the Union Cycliste Internationale was still located in Sheffield.

2018
2018 saw a further internationalisation of the roster, with the additions of German Lea Lin Teutenberg and Dutchwoman Aafke Soet. Spanish bicycle component manufacturer, Rotor signed onto Team WNT as a second naming sponsor, setting the team to be the first to race full-time on hydraulic shifting and braking groupset. WNT-Rotor took on a greater Spanish influence with its switch from long time frame partner Specialized to Orbea. The team also joined as one of five UCI women's teams to transition to disc brakes in 2018, moving from its already new hydraulic Rotor rim brake groupset to debut the disc brake version at Dwars door Vlaanderen.

Shortly after the team completed Setmana Ciclista Valenciana, it was announced that Graeme Herd would leave the team immediately, with Dirk Baldinger taking up Herd's role as DS. Former  rider, Canadian Gabrielle Pilote-Fortin was a late signing for 2018 at the end of March.

Half the team's then ten rider roster were selected to compete on the road and track at the 2018 Commonwealth Games; for Northern Ireland, Lydia Boylan, for Wales, Hayley Jones, for Scotland, Eileen Roe, and for England Melissa Lowther and Hayley Simmonds. While Melissa Lowther had been selected for both the time trial and road race, but due to an administrative error by Team England, Lowther was barred from starting the individual time trial. Hayley Simmonds earned a bronze medal in the Commonwealth Games individual time trial, behind recent ITT world championship medallist Katrin Garfoot and former time trial world champion Linda Villumsen.

Aafke Soet earned WNT Rotor's first win of the 2018 season at the start of April by winning the last stage of the Healthy Ageing Tour in solo breakaway, the victory was also her first-ever elite-level win. Soet would back up that road race win at her next race appearance, with the fastest time in the time trial event at Omloop van Borsele.

2019
The Season 2019 started very successfully for the WNT-ROTOR Pro Cycling Team. After wins at the Six Days in Bremen (Germany) on the track the new team member Clara Koppenburg won stage 3 of the Seltmana Ciclista Valenciana and took over the General Classification jersey. The team defended this jersey on stage 4 and also won the team classification. One-week later Kirsten Wild and Lisa Brennauer won in total 5 medals at the Track World Championships in Pruszków, Poland; Wild won gold in the Madison and omnium, Silver in the scratch race and Bronze in the points race, while Brennauer won a silver medal in the individual pursuit and a new German record).

The team won its first UCI Women's World Tour race at Driedaagse Brugge-De Panne with Kirsten Wild who won the bunch sprint after a big lead out from Lisa Brennauer. Three days later, Kirsten Wild won Gent–Wevelgem, becoming the first rider to win the Belgian spring classic twice.

In total the team amassed 15 victories in road racing during the 2019 season with four different riders. Kathrin Hammes won the overall classification of the Lotto Thüringen Ladies Tour after being in the breakaway on stage 1. The team helped defended the yellow, where Kathrin was able to win her home tour by 11 seconds.

On 28 November 2019, the team announced that the CERATIZIT Group, who are the parent company of WNT would be joining as title sponsor of the team.

Team roster

Major wins

2017
Stage 4 Semana Ciclista Valenciana, Lydia Boylan
Stage 3 Thüringen Rundfahrt der Frauen, Hayley Simmonds
Round 2 Stoke-on-Trent Tour Series, Katie Archibald
Round 6 Bath Tour Series, Eileen Roe
Round 7 Motherwell Tour Series, Eileen Roe
Round 8 Team Time Trial, Stevenage Tour Series, Katie Archibald, Emily Kay, Keira McVitty, Gabriella Shaw, Lydia Boylan

2018
Stage 5 Healthy Ageing Tour, Aafke Soet
Omloop van Borsele Time Trial, Aafke Soet
 Young rider classification Emakumeen Euskal Bira, Aafke Soet

2019
 Overall Setmana Ciclista Valenciana, Clara Koppenburg
Stage 3, Clara Koppenburg
1st  Three Days of De Panne, Kirsten Wild
1st  Gent–Wevelgem, Kirsten Wild
Stages 3 & 5 Healthy Ageing Tour, Kirsten Wild
Stage 4b Healthy Ageing Tour, Lisa Brennauer
 Overall Festival Elsy Jacobs, Lisa Brennauer
 Points classification, Lisa Brennauer
Stage 2, Lisa Brennauer
 Basque rider classification Emakumeen Euskal Bira, Ane Santesteban
 Overall Thüringen Rundfahrt der Frauen, Kathrin Hammes
Stages 1 & 2 Tour de Bretagne Féminin, Kirsten Wild
 Overall Madrid Challenge by La Vuelta Lisa Brennauer
Stage 1 (ITT), Lisa Brennauer

2021
La Picto–Charentaise, Marta Lach

2022
Stage 5 Bretagne Ladies Tour, Marta Lach
Stage 2 Tour of Uppsala, Hanna Nilsson
Stage 1 Giro della Toscana Int. Femminile, Martina Fidanza
Overall Tour de la Semois, Maria Giulia Confalonieri
Stage 3 Tour de Romandie, Marta Lach

National, European and World Championships

2015
 Irish Road Race, Lydia Boylan
2016
 Irish Road Race, Lydia Boylan
2017
 British Track (Individual pursuit), Katie Archibald
 British Track (Points race), Katie Archibald
 British Track (Scratch race), Katie Archibald
 British Track (Omnium), Katie Archibald
 British Criterium, Katie Archibald
 World Track (Omnium), Katie Archibald
 Irish Road Race, Lydia Boylan
 Irish Track (Scratch race), Lydia Boylan
 European Track (Individual pursuit), Katie Archibald
 European Track (Omnium), Katie Archibald
2018
 Irish Track (Omnium), Lydia Boylan
 European U23 Time Trial, Aafke Soet
 Irish Track (Scratch Race), Lydia Boylan
2019
 World Track (Omnium), Kirsten Wild
 World Track (Madison), Kirsten Wild
 European Track (Omnium), Kirsten Wild
 European Track (Elimination Race), Kirsten Wild
 European Track (Individual Pursuit), Franziska Brausse
 European Track (U23 Individual Pursuit), Franziska Brausse
 German Road Race, Lisa Brennauer
 German Track (Madison), Franziska Brausse
 German Track (Madison), Lin Teutenberg
 German Track (Omnium), Franziska Brausse
 German Track (Team Pursuit), Franziska Brausse
 German Track (Individual Pursuit), Franziska Brausse

2020
 World Track (Madison), Kirsten Wild
 World Track (Scratch), Kirsten Wild
 Denmark Track (Omnium), Julie Leth
 German Road Race, Lisa Brennauer
 European Team Time Trial, Lisa Brennauer
 Denmark Track (Individual Sprint), Julie Leth
 European U23 Track (Individual pursuit), Franziska Brauße

2021
 German Time Trial, Lisa Brennauer
 German Road Race, Lisa Brennauer
 Olympic Games Track (Team pursuit), Franziska Brauße
 Olympic Games Track (Team pursuit), Lisa Brennauer
 World Mixed Team Time Trial, Lisa Brennauer
 European (Individual pursuit), Lisa Brennauer
 European (Team pursuit), Lisa Brennauer
 European (Team pursuit),Franziska Brauße
 World Track (Madison), Kirsten Wild
 World Track (Team pursuit), Lisa Brennauer
 World Track (Team pursuit), Franziska Brauße
 World Track (Individual pursuit), Lisa Brennauer

2022
 German Time Trial, Lisa Brennauer
 Austria Track (Omnium), Kathrin Schweinberger
 Austria Track (Madison), Kathrin Schweinberger
 Austria Track (Points race), Kathrin Schweinberger
 Austria Track (Scratch race), Kathrin Schweinberger
 World Track (Individual pursuit), Franziska Brauße
 World Track (Team pursuit), Martina Fidanza
 World Track (Scratch race), Martina Fidanza

References

External links

UCI Women's Teams
Cycling teams established in 2014
Cycling teams based in Germany